Albert Pike Lucas (1862–1945) was an American landscape, figure, and portrait painter; also a sculptor. He was born in Jersey City, and studied at the École des Beaux-Arts (1882–1888) in Paris under Hébert and Boulanger and later under Courtois and Dagman-Bouveret. At the Salon of 1896 he won a medal. After a sojourn in Italy he settled in New York in 1902. His painting is distinctly personal, with the lyric note predominant, and shows sympathetic intimacy with nature, especially in her larger and more mysterious aspects. His handling is broad yet conscientious, his color scheme rich and glowing, and he excels in the management of diffused light, as seen most strikingly in his well-known "Golden Madonna." He painted by preference nocturnes and twilight scenes, such as "October Breezes" (National Gallery, of Art, Washington), "The Little Church on the Hill," and "Walking against the Wind." He also painted portraits of many prominent persons. A good specimen of his work as a sculptor is the statuette "Ecstasy," in the Metropolitan Museum, New York.

References

External links
Paintings by Albert P. Lucas, an exhibition catalog of the artist available as a full-text PDF from The Metropolitan Museum of Art Libraries.

Artists from Jersey City, New Jersey
19th-century American painters
American male painters
20th-century American painters
1862 births
1945 deaths
20th-century American sculptors
20th-century American male artists
19th-century American sculptors
American male sculptors
Painters from New Jersey
American alumni of the École des Beaux-Arts
American landscape painters
American portrait painters
Sculptors from New Jersey
19th-century American male artists